The major system (also called the phonetic number system, phonetic mnemonic system, or Herigone's mnemonic system) is a  mnemonic technique used to aid in memorizing numbers.

The system works by converting numbers into consonants, then into words by adding vowels.  The system works on the principle that images can be remembered more easily than numbers.

One notable explanation of this system was given in Martin Gardner's book The First Scientific American Book of Mathematical Puzzles and Diversions (just Mathematical Puzzles and Diversions in the UK edition), which has since been republished in The New Martin Gardner Mathematical Library as Hexaflexagons, Probability Paradoxes, and the Tower of Hanoi. In this, Gardner traces the history of the system back to Pierre Hérigone and Richard Grey with uses by Lewis Carroll and Gottfried Wilhelm Leibniz.

The system
Each numeral is associated with one or more consonants. (In other words, the link is to the sound, not the letter. For example, the letters C in "cat", "Cynthia", and "cello" each have different values in the system – 7, 0, and 6, respectively.) Vowels, semivowels and the consonant /h/ are ignored. These can be used as "fillers" to make sensible words from the resulting consonant sequences. A standard mapping is:

The groups of similar sounds and the rules for applying the mappings are almost always fixed, but other hooks and mappings can be used as long as the person using the system can remember them and apply them consistently.

Each numeral maps to a set of similar sounds with similar mouth and tongue positions. The link is phonetic, that is to say, it is the consonant sounds that matter, not the spelling. Therefore, a word like action would encode the number 762 (/k/-/ʃ/-/n/), not 712 (k-t-n). Double letters are disregarded when not pronounced separately, e.g. muddy encodes 31 (/m/-/d/), not 311, but midday encodes 311 (/m/-/d/-/d/) while accept encodes 7091 (/k/-/s/-/p/-/t/) since the ds and cs are pronounced separately. x encodes 70 when pronounced as /ks/ or /gz/ (e.g. in fax and exam) and 76 when pronounced /kʃ/ or /gʒ/ (e.g. in anxious or luxury); z encodes 10 when pronounced /ts/ (e.g. in pizza). In ghost (701, /ɡ/-/s/-/t/) and enough (28, /n/-/f/), gh is being encoded by different numerals. Usually, a rhotic accent is assumed, e.g. fear would encode 84 (/f/-/r/) rather than 8 (/f/).

Often the mapping is compact. Hindquarters, for example, translates unambiguously to 2174140 (/n/-/d/-/k/-/r/-/t/-/r/-/z/), which amounts to a twelve-letter word encoded by seven digits in seven letters, and can be easily visualized.

Each numeral maps to a set of similar sounds with similar mouth and tongue positions.
For most people it would be easier to remember 3.1415927 (an approximation of the mathematical constant pi) as:
 meteor (314, /m/-/t/-/r/)
 tail (15, /t/-/l/)
 pink (927, /p/-/ŋ/-/k/, and taking /ŋ/ to be 2)

Short term visual memory of imagined scenes allows large numbers of digits to be memorized with ease. Longer-term memory may require the formulation of more object-related mnemonics with greater logical connection, perhaps forming grammatical sentences that apply to the matter rather than just strings of images.

The system can be employed with phone numbers. One would typically make up multiple words, preferably a sentence, or an ordered sequence of images featuring the owner of the number.

The Major System can be combined with a peg system for remembering lists, and is sometimes used also as a method of generating the pegs. It can also be combined with other memory techniques such as rhyming, substitute words, or the method of loci. Repetition and concentration using the ordinary memory is still required.

An advantage of the major system is that it is possible to use a computer to automatically translate the number into a set of words. One can then pick the best of several alternatives. Such programs include "Numzi" "Rememberg" "Fonbee", the freeware "2Know", and the website "pinfruit".

Example words
Some of these example words may belong to more than one word category.

  Assumes a rhotic accent
  nanny (verb): to be overprotective towards
  mum (adjective): silent; not saying a word
  agape (adjective): with the mouth wide open, as in wonder, surprise, or eagerness
  fife (noun): a high-pitched transverse flute used commonly in military and marching musical groups
  viva (verb): to examine orally
  fob (verb), archaic: to cheat; deceive

History
A different memory system, the method of loci, was taught to schoolchildren for centuries, at least until 1584, "when Puritan reformers declared it unholy for encouraging bizarre and irreverent images."  The same objection can be made over the major system, with or without the method of loci. Mental images may be easier to remember if they are insulting, violent, or obscene (see Von Restorff effect).

Pierre Hérigone (1580–1643) devised the earliest version of the major system. The system was further developed by Stanislaus Mink von Wennsshein in the 17th century. It was later elaborated upon by other users.  In 1730, Richard Grey set forth a complicated system that used both consonants and vowels to represent the digits. In 1808 Gregor von Feinaigle introduced the improvement of representing the digits by consonants (but reversed the values of 8 and 9 compared to those listed above).

In 1825 Aimé Paris published the first known version of the major system in its modern form.

In 1843, Carl Otto Reventlow (1817-1873) published a mnemonics textbook on a method similar to Paris' and traveled throughout Germany promoting it. 

In 1844 Francis Fauvel Gouraud (1808-1847) delivered a series of lectures introducing his mnemonic system which was based on Aimé Paris' version. The lectures drew some of the largest crowds ever assembled to hear lectures of a "scientific" nature up to that time. This series of lectures was later published as Phreno-Mnemotechny or The Art of Memory in 1845 and his system received wide acclaim. According to Gouraud,  Richard Grey indicated that a discussion on Hebrew linguistics in William Beveridge's Institutionum chronotogicarum libri duo, una cum totidem arithmetices chronologicæ libellis (London, 1669) inspired him  to create his system of mnemotechniques which later evolved in to the major system.

In the 1880s Marcus Dwight Larrowe, alias Silas Holmes, was teaching memory courses in the United States based on the Major System using a third alias Dr. Antoine Loisette. Because he was charging inordinate sums of money for a system which had obviously existed before, George S. Fellows published "Loisette" exposed (1888) and included all the material of Larrowe's course which he determined not to be under copyright. The incident was notable enough to gain coverage by way of a book review in the journal Science. A well-known student of Loisette's included Mark Twain whose endorsement Loisette used regularly to sell his course. Following the revelation that he had not originated the system, Larrowe self-published his material under the pseudonym Dr. Antoine Loisette in 1895 and 1896 and it was later re-published by Funk & Wagnalls in 1899.

In the late 1800s Christof Ludwig Poehlmann (aka Christopher Louis Pelman), a German who had emigrated to the United States, and William Joseph Ennever created and ran a series of booklets and memory courses using the system which resulted in The Pelman Schools, The Pelman Institute, and were generally known as Pelmanism.

Poehlmann eventually moved back to Germany around 1910 where he continued offering his memory courses and training apparently with a focus on language learning.  indicated that he studied under him for a year in 1911. Fürst later practiced criminal law in Frankfort in pre-Hitler Germany before fleeing, as a Jew, to Prague where he taught at Masaryk University until emigrating to New York in 1939. In 1939, Fürst published Use your Head followed by How to Remember (1944), which was later reprinted as The Practical Way to Better Memory, and followed up with a series of 12 booklets entitled You Can Remember! A Home Study Course in Memory and Concentration (1946) which all extolled the system, which he called the "Basic List" and the "Number System" along with other mnemonic systems. In a 1946 profile in The New Yorker, Bruno indicates that German scholar Conradus Celtes originated the system.

The system described in this article would be re-popularized after 1957 and through the 1980s in several books by Harry Lorayne, a magician and best selling contemporary author on memory. The most popular of the titles featuring the system is The Memory Book: The Classic Guide to Improving Your Memory at Work, at School, and at Play (1974, with Jerry Lucas).

This phonetic system had another resurgence in the 1990s thanks to the late night infomercials of Kevin Trudeau who sold a series of tapes called Mega Memory. He also published a similar book Kevin Trudeau's Mega Memory which used this same system with some slight modifications.

The name "Major System" may refer to Major Bartlomiej Beniowski, who published a version of the system in his book, The Anti-Absurd or Phrenotypic English Pronouncing and Orthographical Dictionary.

There is a reasonable historical possibility that the roots of the Major System are entangled with older systems of shorthand.  It is certainly the case that the underlying structure of the Major System has a direct overlap with Gregg shorthand, which was a popular shorthand system in the late 1800s and early 1900s.

Phonetic number memorization systems also occur in other parts of the world, such as the Katapayadi system going back to at least the 7th Century in India.

Practice
Memory feats centered around numbers can be performed by experts who have learned a 'vocabulary' of at least one image for each 1 and 2-digit number, as these can then be combined to form narratives. Learning a vocabulary of 3-digit numbers is harder, because ten times more images need to be learned for each extra digit. Many mnemonists, however, can use a set of over 1000 images.

The combination of images into a narrative is easier to do rapidly than forming a coherent grammatical sentence. This pre-memorisation and practice at forming images reduces the time required to think up a good imaginary object while creating a strong memorable impression of it.  The best words for this purpose are usually nouns, especially those for distinctive objects such as those which make strong impressions on a variety of senses (e.g. "Lime" for 53, as its taste, smell, colour, and even texture are distinctive) or which move (e.g. "arrow" for 4). For basic proficiency, a large vocabulary of image words isn't really necessary, since when the table above is reliably learned, it is easy to form your own words ad hoc.

Indexing sequences
Mnemonics often center around learning a complete sequence where all objects in that sequence that come before the one you are trying to recall must be recalled first.  For instance, using the mnemonic "Richard of York gave battle in vain" to learn the colours of the rainbow; (red, orange, yellow, green, blue, indigo and violet) to remember what colour comes after indigo, one would have to recall the whole sequence. For a short sequence this may be trivial; for longer lists, it can become complicated and error-prone.

A good example would be in recalling the 53rd element of the periodic table.  It might be possible for some people to construct and then learn a string of 53 or more items which you have substituted for the elements and then to recall them one by one, counting them off as you go, but it would be a great deal easier and less laborious/tedious to directly associate element 53 with, for example, a lime (a suitable mnemonic for 53) recalling some prior imagining of yours regarding a mishap where lime juice gets into one's eye - "eye" sounding like "I", the symbol for Iodine. This allows for random access directly to the item, without the need for recalling any previous items.

If you were remembering element 54 in the process of recalling the periodic table you could then recall an image for 54, for instance thinking of a friend called "Laura" (54) in the lotus position looking very Zen-like in order to remind yourself that element 54 is Xenon.

This is an example of combining the Major System with the peg system.

See also
Dominic system
Memory sport
Katapayadi system
Rhyming Letter Getters

References

Gouraud, Francis Fauvel Phreno-Mnemotechny or The Art of Memory Wiley & Putnam 1845
Lorayne, Harry and Lucas, Jerry, The Memory Book:  The Classic Guide to Improving Your Memory at Work, at School, at Play Ballantine Books; Reissue edition (1996) .
Pseudonumerology Totally dedicated to the Major System.
 University of Amsterdam - Online Memory Improvement Course is an online step-by-step tutorial of the Phonetic Mnemonic System

External links

Software
 iOS app to learn and practice the major system
 Numzi - free web application for converting numbers to words/phrases and vice versa using the Major System.  Covers the English language with over 220,000 words.  Numzi also has an iOS app which is a portable Major System number-word converter.
 2Know is free Windows software for converting numbers to words (English, German, French).
 Mnemisis Another free mnemonic program - runs on Linux, Mac OS X, and Windows
 Memagine iPhone app that uses the system to teach how to recall a list of up to 100 items in any order
 Major System iPhone app that helps you to create your own list of words and practice it
 pinfruit.com Web application for the mnemonic major system
 Major System Trainer Free personalisable web application for learning the digit mappings, and encodings for all 1 and 2 digit words
 Major System Tool Free web application for converting numbers to words using Derren Brown's encoding.
 Mnemonic Major System Module A free module for the drupal content management system by rolf vreijdenberger - web based
 dingn.com Training and recall of 1 digit to 4 digits numbers, vocabulary cards and a deck of shuffled playing cards with personalized favorite word selection for each number.
 LOC Serendipity A quiz to learn the sound/number correspondences of the Major system by rote. Also available are quizzes to learn the top 100 adjective and noun representations from 00 to 99.

Other
 Mammoth Memory's system for memorising decimal numbers 0-999
 Online mnemonic directory for remembering numbers with the major system
 Memory Improvement and Learning Information
 MEMORIAD - Official Website of World Memory Olympiad
 Homepage of World Memory Championships
Numzi Peg Words for 0 - 100, with Peg Word Story
Andi Bell's system for the decimal numbers 00-99
Collection of Mnemonic Devices 

Mnemonics